German submarine U-1191 was a Type VIIC U-boat of Nazi Germany's Kriegsmarine during World War II.

Construction 
The U-1191 was laid down on 4 November 1942 at the F Schichau shipyard in Danzig, Poland. She was launched on 6 July 1943 and commissioned on 9 September 1943 under the command of Oberleutnant zur See Peter Grau.

She was assessed at  submerged. She had two shafts and two  propellers.

The submarine was fitted with five  torpedo tubes (four fitted at the bow and one at the stern), fourteen torpedoes, one  deck gun (220 rounds), one  Flak M42 and two twin  C/30 anti-aircraft guns. The boat had a complement of 44 to 57 men.

Service history
U-1191 was used as a Training ship in the 8th U-boat Flotilla from 9 September 1943 until 30 April 1944, before serving in the 7th U-boat Flotilla for active service on 1 May 1944. She was fitted with a Schnorchel underwater-breathing apparatus in April 1944.

Patrol and loss 
During her active service, U-1191 made 1 patrol. She left Stavanger with 50 crew on 22 May 1944 for her first patrol and patrolled the North Atlantic, North of the Faroe Islands, West off the coast of Ireland and northwest of France.

All 50 crew members on board were lost. She was first listed as missing and it was thought that she had been sunk by a mine or by human error instead of by depth charges. In total U-1191 spent 50 days at sea.

Wreck 

References

Bibliography

German Type VIIC submarines
U-boats commissioned in 1943
World War II submarines of Germany
Ships built in Danzig
1943 ships
Maritime incidents in July 1944
Shipwrecks in the English Channel
Ships built by Schichau
Ships lost with all hands